Streets is the plural of street, a type of road.

Streets or The Streets may also refer to:

Music
 Streets (band), a rock band fronted by Kansas vocalist Steve Walsh
 Streets (punk album), a 1977 compilation album of various early UK punk bands
 Streets..., a 1975 album by Ralph McTell
 Streets: A Rock Opera, a 1991 album by Savatage

 "Streets" (song) by Doja Cat, from the album Hot Pink (2019)
 "Streets", a song by Avenged Sevenfold from the album Sounding the Seventh Trumpet (2001)
 The Streets, alias of Mike Skinner, a British rapper
 "The Streets" (song) by WC featuring Snoop Dogg and Nate Dogg, from the album Ghetto Heisman (2002)

Other uses
 Streets (film), a 1990 American horror film
 Streets (ice cream), an Australian ice cream brand owned by Unilever
 Streets (solitaire), a variant of the solitaire game Napoleon at St Helena
 Tai Streets (born 1977), American football player
 Will Streets (1886–1916), English soldier and poet of the First World War
 The Streets (performance art), by Abel Azcona

See also
 
 
 Street (disambiguation)